Žarnovica is a town and municipality in the Žarnovica District, Banská Bystrica Region in Slovakia. The town is situated in the Hron river valley. It has a population of around 6,000 people.

History
The first written mention about Žarnovica is dated to 1332.

Geography
It is located in the Žiar Basin in central Slovakia, on the Hron River, between Vtáčnik and Štiavnické vrchy mountain ranges.

Demographics
According to the 2001 census, the town had 6,596 inhabitants. 95.59% of inhabitants were Slovaks, 1.61% Roma and 0.73% Czechs. The religious make-up was 78.73% Roman Catholics, 15.25% people with no religious affiliation and 1.32% Lutherans.

References

External links
Municipal website 

Cities and towns in Slovakia
Villages and municipalities in Žarnovica District